Mikaela Laurén (born 20 January 1976) is a Swedish professional boxer and former national team swimmer. In boxing she held the WBC female light middleweight title from 2014 to 2016, and has challenged once for the undisputed female welterweight championship in 2017. As of September 2020, she is ranked as the world's fourth best active light-middleweight by The Ring and seventh by BoxRec.

Early life 
Laurén grew up in Enskede in southern Stockholm. She started swimming at the age of three and trained with the Stockholm police sports association. At the age of eighteen she moved to the United States, there she was recruited by the University of Nebraska–Lincoln. During her stay in the country she decided to tattoo the text "Destiny" on her lower back, at the same time that her best friend, swimmer Therese Alshammar, tattooed the text "Diva" at the same spot on her body. In 2001 Laurén returned to Sweden and continued her preparation for the 2004 Summer Olympics in Athens.

In March 2005, she was arrested for having anabolic steroids in her home. She was sentenced to one year and two months imprisonment for doping and weapon crimes. She served her sentence until her release in May 2006. During her imprisonment she studied nutrition and training at the Mittuniversity in Östersund. She also continued physio and lead the training for the inmates at the prison. After her release she educated herself to become a personal trainer, she decided to return to Santa Monica in the United States to start her work in becoming a professional boxer.

Laurén competed in the celebrity dance show Let's Dance 2017 which is broadcast on TV4. She was the first dancer to be eliminated.

Professional boxing career 
Laurén signed a contract with New Sweden in May 2007 and made her professional debut in April 2009. On 24 September 2010 she defeated Jill Emery via unanimous decision. On 30 October 2010 Mikaela met the boxer Cecilia Brækhus in a match in Germany where she lost on technical knockout in the seventh round.

She has made 36 professional matches and won 31 of them. On 8 November 2014 she won the WBC title in superwelter weight against the American boxer Aleksandra Magdaziak.

Professional boxing record

References

External links 

Living people
1975 births
Swedish female swimmers
Swedish women boxers
Sportspeople from Stockholm
SK Neptun swimmers
World Boxing Council champions
Welterweight boxers
Light-middleweight boxers
Middleweight boxers
World light-middleweight boxing champions